Pleurothallis phyllocardioides is a species of orchid occurring from Central America to Bolivia.

phyllocardioides